This is a list of films and television series produced by The Walt Disney Company based on or suggested by Disney Park attractions. They are distributed by Walt Disney Pictures unless otherwise noted. The list also includes any relevant sequels, spin-offs, and remakes.

Released

Upcoming

Television series

Television specials

Short film

Scrapped projects
In October 2018, it was reported that Disney had been looking for ways to reboot the Pirates of the Caribbean franchise, bringing on Deadpool (2016) writers Rhett Reese and Paul Wernick, though producer Jerry Bruckheimer was expected to return. However, in February 2019, Reese and Wernick departed the project and the reboot was cancelled.

A female-led spin-off was announced in June 2020, starring Margot Robbie with Christina Hodson writing the screenplay. The film was to be separate from the sixth film also being developed. Bruckheimer was attached as producer. In November 2022, Robbie said the project was not going forward.

Reception

Box office performance

Critical and public response

Academy Awards

See also
 List of Disney live-action adaptations and remakes of Disney animated films

Notes

References 

Lists of films released by Disney

Disney attractions,adaptations
Walt Disney Pictures films